Puperita is a genus of snails, gastropod mollusks in the family Neritidae.

Species
Species within the genus Puperita include:

 Puperita bensoni (Recluz, 1850)
 Puperita pupa (Linnaeus, 1767) - in the brackish water

References

External links

Neritidae
Taxa named by John Edward Gray